Tony Loffreda is a Canadian politician and former banker.  On July 22, 2019, he was appointed as a Canadian Senator representing the province of Quebec.  He previously worked as a Royal Bank of Canada executive in Montreal.

Loffreda is a Certified Public Accountant. He holds a Bachelor of Commerce from Concordia University, where he now serves on the board of governors.  He was awarded a Sovereign's Medal for Volunteers for his volunteer work for various health related charities.

On November 7, 2019, Senator Loffreda joined the Independent Senators Group (ISG).

References

External links
 

Living people
Canadian senators from Quebec
Independent Senators Group
21st-century Canadian politicians
Concordia University alumni
Canadian people of Italian descent
1962 births